Ponte Lungo is a station on the Rome Metro. It is on Line A and is located in Appio Latino, between Re di Roma and Furio Camillo stations.

It is located at the intersection of Via Appia Nuova, Piazza di Ponte Lungo and Via Gela.

This station can be used as an interchange with Tuscolana station, which provides the Lazio Regional Railway services FL1 and FL5.

References

External links

Rome Metro Line A stations
Railway stations opened in 1980
1980 establishments in Italy
Rome Q. VIII Tuscolano
Railway stations in Italy opened in the 20th century